Raula Pai Gaya - Fun Unlimited is a Punjabi film starring Ravinder Grewal and Surbhi Jyoti in the main lead. The movie is home production of Ravinder Grewal under his banner RG Productions. The film is directed by Atharv Baluja. Raula Pai Gaya's music has been given by Ravinder Grewal himself. The movie's story is written by Rahul Deveshwar and Atharv Baluja. Bobby 
Sandhu has written the screenplay and Dialogues.

Plot

The film has been shot entirely in Punjab, with most of the shoot taking place at Ludhiana, Patiala and Chandigarh. One of the song sequences has been shot in Goa as well.

This film is released on 31 August 2012.

Cast and crew
 Ravinder Grewal as Rajvir 
 Surbhi Jyoti as Reet
 Parjesh Kapil as Chhottu
 Jaswinder Bhalla as Prof. Bhalla
 Binnu Dhillon as Sunny
 B.N. Sharma as Sweety
 Sardar Sohi as Chacha
 Kartar Cheema as Sukhi
 Maninder Vaily as Ghochi
 Bobby Layal as Harman
 Damandeep Singh Mann as Bajwa
 Harjit Harman as Guest appearance
 Raviraj as Lyrics

References 

2012 films
Punjabi-language Indian films
2010s Punjabi-language films